<noinclude>

Bluegrass music is a genre of American roots music that developed in the 1940s in the Appalachian region of the United States. The genre derives its name from the band Bill Monroe and the Blue Grass Boys. Like mainstream country music, it largely developed out of old-time string music, though in contrast, bluegrass is traditionally played exclusively on acoustic instruments and also has roots in traditional English, Scottish, and Irish ballads and dance tunes as well as in blues and jazz. Bluegrass was further developed by musicians who played with Monroe, including 5-string banjo player Earl Scruggs and guitarist Lester Flatt. Monroe characterized the genre as: "Scottish bagpipes and ole-time fiddlin'. It's a part of Methodist, Holiness and Baptist traditions. It's blues and jazz, and it has a high lonesome sound."

Bluegrass features acoustic stringed instruments and emphasizes the off-beat. Notes are anticipated, in contrast to laid back blues where notes are behind the beat, which creates the higher energy characteristic of bluegrass. In bluegrass, as in some forms of jazz, one or more instruments each takes its turn playing the melody and improvising around it, while the others perform accompaniment; this is especially typified in tunes called breakdowns. This is in contrast to old-time music, in which all instruments play the melody together or one instrument carries the lead throughout while the others provide accompaniment. Breakdowns are often characterized by rapid tempos and unusual instrumental dexterity and sometimes by complex chord changes.

Characteristics

Instrumentation
 The violin (also known as the fiddle), five-string banjo, guitar, mandolin, and upright bass (string bass) are often joined by the resonator guitar (also referred to as a Dobro) and (occasionally) harmonica or Jew's harp. This instrumentation originated in rural dance bands and is the basis on which the earliest bluegrass bands were formed.

The fiddle, made by Italians and first used in sixteenth century Europe, was one of the first instruments to be brought into America. It became popular due to its small size and versatility.  Fiddles are also used in country, classical, and old time music.

Banjos were brought to America through the African slave trade. They began receiving attention from white Americans when minstrel shows incorporated the banjo as part of their acts.  The "clawhammer", or two finger style playing, was popular before the Civil War. Now, however, banjo players use mainly the three-finger picking style made popular by banjoists such as Earl Scruggs. 

Guitarists have an important role in bluegrass. They are used primarily for rhythmic purposes and keep the sound moving while other instruments take time for a break as well as taking breaks themselves on occasion. The instrument originates from eighteenth century Spain, but there were no American-made models until the C.F. Martin Company started to manufacture them in the 1830s. The guitar is now most commonly played with a style referred to as flatpicking, unlike the style of early bluegrass guitarists such as Lester Flatt, who used a thumb pick and finger pick. 

Bassists almost always play pizzicato, occasionally adopting the "slap-style" to accentuate the beat. A bluegrass bass line is generally a rhythmic alternation between the root and fifth of each chord, with occasional walking bass excursions.

Instrumentation has been a continuing topic of debate. Traditional bluegrass performers believe the "correct" instrumentation is that used by Bill Monroe's band, the Blue Grass Boys (guitar, mandolin, fiddle, banjo, and bass). Departures from the traditional instrumentation have included dobro, accordion, harmonica, piano, autoharp, drums, electric guitar, and electric versions of other common bluegrass instruments, resulting in what has been referred to as "new grass", although even Monroe himself was known to experiment with instrumentation, once even using a string orchestra, choir, and pre-recorded bird-song track.

Vocals
Apart from specific instrumentation, a distinguishing characteristic of bluegrass is vocal harmony featuring two, three, or four parts, often with a dissonant or modal sound in the highest voice (see modal frame), a style described as the "high, lonesome sound."  Commonly, the ordering and layering of vocal harmony is called the "stack". A standard stack has a baritone voice at the bottom, the lead in the middle (singing the main melody) and a tenor at the top; although stacks can be altered, especially where a female voice is included. Alison Krauss and Union Station provide a good example of a different harmony stack with a baritone and tenor with a high lead, an octave above the standard melody line, sung by the female vocalist. However, by employing variants to the standard trio vocal arrangement, they were simply following a pattern existing since the early days of the genre. Both the Stanley Brothers and the Osborne Brothers employed the use of a high lead with the tenor and baritone below it. The Stanleys used it numerous times in their recordings for both Mercury and King records.  This particular stack was most famously employed by the Osborne Brothers who first employed it during their time with MGM records in the latter half of the 1950s. This vocal arrangement would become the trademark of the Osbornes' sound with Bobby's high, clear voice at the top of the vocal stack. Additionally, the Stanley Brothers also utilized a high baritone part on several of their trios recorded for Columbia records during their time with that label (1949–1952). Mandolin player Pee Wee Lambert sang the high baritone above Ralph Stanley's tenor, both parts above Carter's lead vocal. This trio vocal arrangement was variously used by other groups as well; even Bill Monroe employed it in his 1950 recording of "When the Golden Leaves Begin to Fall'. In the 1960s Flatt and Scruggs often added a fifth part to the traditional quartet parts on gospel songs, the extra part being a high baritone (doubling the baritone part sung in the normal range of that voice; E.P. Tullock [aka Cousin Jake] normally providing the part, though at times it was handled by Curly Seckler).

Themes
Bluegrass tunes often take the form of narratives on the everyday lives of the people whence the music came. Aside from laments about loves lost, interpersonal tensions and unwanted changes to the region (e.g., the visible effects of mountaintop coal mining), bluegrass vocals frequently reference the hard-scrabble existence of living in Appalachia and other rural areas with modest financial resources. Some protest music has been composed in the bluegrass style, especially concerning the vicissitudes of the Appalachian coal mining industry. Railroading has also been a popular theme, with ballads such as "Wreck of the Old 97" and "Nine Pound Hammer" (from the legend of John Henry) being exemplary.

History

Creation

Bluegrass, as a distinct musical form, developed from elements of old-time music and traditional music of the Appalachian region of the United States. The Appalachian region was where many Scottish American immigrants settled, bringing with them the musical traditions of their homelands. Hence the sounds of jigs and reels, especially as played on the fiddle, were innate to the developing style. Black musicians, meanwhile, brought the iconic banjo to Appalachia. Much later, in 1945, Earl Scruggs would develop a three-finger roll on the instrument which allowed a rapid-fire cascade of notes that could keep up with the driving tempo of the new bluegrass sound.

Settlers from Britain and Ireland arrived in Appalachia during the 18th century and brought with them the musical traditions of their homelands. These traditions consisted primarily of English and Scottish ballads—which were essentially unaccompanied narrative—and dance music, such as reels, which were accompanied by a fiddle.  Many older bluegrass songs come directly from the British Isles. Several Appalachian bluegrass ballads, such as "Pretty Saro", "Pretty Polly", "Cuckoo Bird" and "House Carpenter", come from England and preserve the English ballad tradition both melodically and lyrically. Some bluegrass fiddle songs popular in Appalachia, such as "Leather Britches" and "Soldier's Joy", have Scottish roots.  The dance tune "Cumberland Gap" may be derived from the tune that accompanies the Scottish ballad "Bonnie George Campbell".

The music now known as bluegrass was frequently used to accompany a rural dancing style known as buckdancing, flatfooting or clogging. As the bluegrass sound spread to urban areas, listening to it for its own sake increased, especially after the advent of audio recording. In 1948, what would come to be known as bluegrass emerged as a genre within the post-war country/western-music industry, a period of time characterized now as the golden era or wellspring of "traditional bluegrass".  From its earliest days, bluegrass has been recorded and performed by professional and amateur musicians alike. Although amateur bluegrass musicians and trends such as "parking-lot picking" are too important to be ignored, it is touring musicians who have set the direction of the style. Radio stations dedicated to bluegrass have also proved influential in advancing the evolution of the style into distinctive subgenres.

Classification
Bluegrass was initially included in the category of folk music and later changed to hillbilly. In 1948, bluegrass was placed under the country and western heading for radio airplay charting. All four of the seminal bluegrass authors - Artis, Price, Cantwell, and Rosenberg - described bluegrass music in detail as originating in style and form, in one form or another, between the 1930s and mid-1940s. However, the term "bluegrass" did not appear formally to describe the music until the late 1950s and did not appear in Music Index until 1965. The first entry in Music Index mentioning "bluegrass music" directed the reader to "see Country Music; Hillbilly Music". Music Index maintained this listing for bluegrass music until 1986. The first time bluegrass music had its own entries in Music Index was in 1987.

The topical and narrative themes of many bluegrass songs are highly reminiscent of folk music. Many songs that are widely considered to be bluegrass are in reality older works legitimately classified as folk or old-time music that are performed in the bluegrass style. The interplay between bluegrass and folk forms has been academically studied. Folklorist Dr. Neil Rosenberg, for example, shows that most devoted bluegrass fans and musicians are familiar with traditional folk songs and old-time music and that these songs are often played at shows, festivals, and jams.

Origin of name
"Bluegrass" is a common name given in America for the grass of the Poa genus, the most famous being Kentucky bluegrass. A large region in central Kentucky is sometimes called the Bluegrass region (although this region is west of the hills of Kentucky). Exactly when the word "bluegrass" was adopted is not certain, but is believed to be in the late 1950s. It was derived from the name of the seminal Blue Grass Boys band, formed in 1939 with Bill Monroe as its leader. Due to this lineage, Bill Monroe is frequently referred to as the "father of bluegrass".

The bluegrass style of music dates from the mid-1940s. In 1948, the Stanley Brothers recorded the traditional song "Molly and Tenbrooks" in the Blue Grass Boys' style, arguably the point in time that bluegrass emerged as a distinct musical form. Monroe's 1946 to 1948 band, which featured guitarist Lester Flatt, banjoist Earl Scruggs, fiddler Chubby Wise and bassist Howard Watts (also known as "Cedric Rainwater")sometimes called "the original bluegrass band"created the definitive sound and instrumental configuration that remains a model to this day. By some arguments, while the Blue Grass Boys were the only band playing this music, it was just their unique sound; it could not be considered a musical style until other bands began performing in a similar fashion. In 1967, "Foggy Mountain Breakdown" by Flatt and Scruggs, the instrumental banjo music, was introduced to a worldwide audience as a result of its frequent use in the movie "Bonnie and Clyde".  But the functionally similar old-time music genre was long-established and widely recorded in the period of the film's events and later CD was released.
Ralph Stanley commented about the origins of the genre and its name.

Subgenres and recent developments

Traditional bluegrass 
Traditional bluegrass emphasizes the traditional elements and form of the genre as laid out by Bill Monroe and his Blue Grass Boys band in the late 1940s. Traditional bluegrass musicians play folk songs, tunes with simple traditional chord progressions, exclusively on acoustic instruments, though it is common practice to "mic" acoustic instruments during stage performances before larger audiences. In most traditional bluegrass bands, the guitar rarely takes the lead, instead acting as a rhythm instrument, one notable exception being gospel-based songs. Melodies and lyrics tend to be simple, often in the key of G, and a I-IV-V chord pattern is common. In traditional bluegrass, instrumental breaks are typically short and played between sections of a song, conventionally originating as a variation on the song's melody. Also common are breakdowns, an instrumental form that features a series of breaks, each played by a different instrument. Particularly since the 1990s, a number of younger groups have attempted to revive the sound and structure of traditional bluegrass, a trend that has been dubbed Neo-traditional Bluegrass.

Progressive Bluegrass 
Due to the exposure traditional bluegrass acts received on alongside mainstream country music on radio and televised programs such as the Grand Ole Opry, a wave of young, and not exclusively southern musicians began to replicate the genre's format on college campuses and in coffeehouses amidst the American folk music revival of the early 1960s. These artists often incorporated songs, elements, and instruments from other popular genres, particularly rock and roll. Banjoist Earl Scruggs of the Foggy Mountain Boys had shown progressive tendencies since the group's earliest days incorporating jazz-inspired banjo and bass duets and complicated chord progressions that progressed beyond the genre's original rigid and conservative structure. In the late 1960s, Scruggs experimented on duets with saxophonist King Curtis and added songs by the likes of counterculture icon Bob Dylan to the group's repertoire, while bandmate Lester Flatt, a traditionalist, opposed these changes resulting in the group's breakup in 1969. New Grass Revival began utilizing electric instrumentation alongside songs imported from other genres to great popularity in the 1970s and 1980s and the term "newgrass" became synonymous with "progressive bluegrass". Throughout the '80s and '90s, progressive bluegrass continued to evolve, moving closer toward folk and rock in some quarters and closer to jazz in others, while festivals such as the Telluride Bluegrass Festival, RockyGrass in Lyons, Colorado, and MerleFest in Wilkesboro, North Carolina began to attract performing acts from outside the bluegrass tradition, merging the bluegrass community with other popular music scenes across America. Following the death of Jerry Garcia, who had begun his career playing bluegrass, and the dissolution of the Grateful Dead, the blossoming "jam band" scene that followed in their wake embraced and included many acts that performed a style of progressive bluegrass that included extended, exploratory musical improvisation, often called "jamgrass." This style began to define many such acts whose popularity has grown in the 21st century such as Leftover Salmon, The String Cheese Incident, Yonder Mountain String Band,  The Infamous Stringdusters, Railroad Earth, Greensky Bluegrass, and Billy Strings. In recent years, groups like the Punch Brothers, the Jon Stickley Trio, and Nickel Creek have developed a new form of progressive bluegrass which includes highly arranged pieces that resembles contemporary classical music played on bluegrass instruments. These bands feature complicated rhythms, chord schemes, and harmonics combined with improvised solos. At the same time, several popular indie folk and folk rock bands such as the Avett Brothers, Mumford & Sons and Trampled by Turtles have incorporated rhythmic elements or instrumentation from the bluegrass tradition into their popular music arrangements.

Notes

References

 Artis, B. (1975). Bluegrass. NY: Hawthorne Books, Inc. .
 Cantwell, R. (1996). When we were good: The folk revival. Cambridge, MA: Harvard University Press. .
 Cantwell, R. (1984). Bluegrass breakdown: The making of the old southern sound. Chicago: University Illinois Press. .
 Kingsbury, Paul (2004). The Encyclopedia of Country Music: The Ultimate Guide to the Music. Oxford University Press. .
 Lornell, Kip (2020). Capital Bluegrass: Hillbilly Music Meets Washington, DC. Oxford University Press. .
 Lornell, Kip. Exploring American Folk Music : Ethnic, Grassroots, and Regional Traditions in the United States. University Press of Mississippi, 2012. .
 Newby, Tim (2015) Bluegrass in Baltimore. NC: McFarland. .
 Price, S. D. (1975). Old as the hills: The story of bluegrass music. NY: The Viking Press.
 
 van der Merwe, Peter (1989). Origins of the Popular Style: The Antecedents of Twentieth-Century Popular Music. Oxford: Clarendon Press. .
Trischka, Tony, Wernick, Pete, (1988) Masters of the 5-String Banjo, Oak Publications. .

 
American folk music
Country music genres
Old-time music

Culture of the Southern United States
Appalachian culture